Lou Lim Ioc Garden is a garden in São Lázaro, Macau, China.

The garden was built in 1906 by local merchant Lou Kau as part of his residence, and its design follows the well-known Suzhou Gardens. It turned over to the Macau government in 1974 as a public park, which is popular with local inhabitants.

See also

 List of tourist attractions in Macau

1906 establishments in Macau
Gardens in Macau